Centralia Township may refer to the following townships in the United States:

 Centralia Township, Marion County, Illinois
 Centralia Township, Boone County, Missouri